The 2010 Stephen F. Austin Lumberjacks football team represented Stephen F. Austin State University in the 2010 NCAA Division I FCS football season. The team was led by fourth-year head coach J. C. Harper and played its home games at Homer Bryce Stadium. It finished the regular season with a 9–3 record overall and a 6–1 record in the Southland Conference, making the team conference champions. The team qualified for the playoffs, in which it was eliminated in the second round by Villanova.

Schedule

References

Stephen F. Austin
Stephen F. Austin Lumberjacks football seasons
Southland Conference football champion seasons
Stephen F. Austin
Stephen F. Austin Lumberjacks football